The sociology of emotion applies sociological theorems and techniques to the study of human emotions. As sociology emerged primarily as a reaction to the negative effects of modernity, many normative theories deal in some sense with emotion without forming a part of any specific subdiscipline: Karl Marx described capitalism as detrimental to personal 'species-being', Georg Simmel wrote of the deindividualizing tendencies of 'the metropolis', and Max Weber's work dealt with the rationalizing effect of modernity in general.

Theory
Emotions are on one hand constitutive of, embedded in, and on the other hand manipulated or instrumentalized by entities that are studied by sociology on a micro level, such as social roles and norms and 'feeling rules' the everyday social interactions and situations are shaped by, and, on a macro level, by social institutions, discourses, ideologies etc. For instance, (post-)modern marriage is, on one hand, based on the emotion of love and on the other hand the very emotion is to be worked on and regulated by it. Likewise, modern science could not exist without the emotion of curiosity but it does narrow it leading sometimes to over-specialization of science. Many forms of cultural stratification could not exist without disgust and contempt, and there are politics that could not exist without fear, as many civil and ethnic wars could not take place without hate. (requires citation)

We try to regulate our feelings to fit in with the norms of the situation, based on many - sometimes conflicting - demands upon us. Systematic observations of group interaction found that a substantial portion of group activity is devoted to the socio-emotional issues of expressing affect and dealing with tension. Simultaneously, field studies of social attraction in groups revealed that feelings of individuals about each other collate into social networks, a discovery that still is being explored in the field of social network analysis.

Ethnomethodology revealed emotional commitments to everyday norms through purposeful breaching of the norms. For example, students acting as boarders in their own homes reported others' astonishment, bewilderment, shock, anxiety, embarrassment, and anger; family members accused the students of being mean, inconsiderate, selfish, nasty, or impolite. Actors who breach a norm themselves feel waves of emotion, including apprehension, panic, and despair. However, habitual rule breaking leads to declining stress, and may eventually end in enjoyment.

T. David Kemper proposed that people in social interaction have positions on two relational dimensions: status and power. Emotions emerge as interpersonal events change or maintain individuals' status and power. For example, affirming someone else's exalted status produces love-related emotions. Increases or decreases in one's own and other's status or power generate specific emotions whose quality depends on the patterns of change.

Arlie Hochschild proposed that individuals manage their feelings to produce acceptable displays according to ideological and cultural standards. Hochschild showed that jobs often require such emotional labor. Her classic study of emotional labor among flight attendants found that an industry speed-up, reducing contact between flight attendants and passengers, made it impossible for flight attendants to deliver authentic emotional labor, so they ended up surface-acting superficial smiles. Peggy Thoits divided emotion management techniques into implementation of new events and reinterpretation of past events. Thoits noted that emotions also can be managed with drugs, by performing faux gestures and facial expressions, or by cognitive reclassifications of one's feelings.

Sociologist Chris Lucerne states in her article titled “Emotions! Good or Bad”, that there are neither good nor bad emotions. However, you can judge emotions as such. According to Lucerne's theory emotion is believed to help humans express their feelings. Therefore, emotions are a part of human nature to help us communicate. In addition to Chris Lucerne’s theory, when humans experience a situation good or bad an emotion is triggered. As a result of emotion an action is followed. For example, here are a few emotions listed in Lucerne’s article in which people experience daily. The first is the emotion of happiness, which can ignite the sensation to dance. A second emotion is anger, in which the person begins to feel hot causing him or her to perspire. Finally is the emotion of sadness, which creates a sensation of feeling closed in. As a consequence of feeling closed in the person may react irrationally to make them comfortable. Chris Lucerne also states in her article "that no matter what, you cannot control your reactions to emotion." In conclusion to Lucerne's theory, reaction is random in expressing your feelings.

David Straker states that "we should watch our own emotions", likewise in Arlie Hochschild's theory of emotions. Straker talks about how emotions are signals that tell you something about what is happening in the inner you. Sometimes bad emotions can be misleading because of the reaction often causing conflict. To conclude based on Straker's theory, you can use emotions for good or bad. An example Straker talked about was the use of emotion to motivate others.

Thomas J. Scheff established that many cases of social conflict are based on a destructive and often escalating, but stoppable and reversible shame-rage cycle: when someone results or feels shamed by another, their social bond comes under stress. This can be cooperatively acknowledged, talked about and – most effectively when possible - laughed at so their social bond may be restored. Yet, when shame is not acknowledged, but instead negated and repressed, it becomes rage, and rage may drive to aggressive and shaming actions that feed-back negatively on this self-destructive situation. The social management of emotions might be the fundamental dynamics of social cooperation and conflict around resources, complexity, conflict, and moral life. It is a well-established sociological fact that expression and feeling of the emotion of anger, for example, is strongly discouraged (repressed) in girls and women in many cultures, while fear is discouraged in boys and men. Some cultures and sub-cultures encourage or discourage happiness, sadness, jealousy, excitedness, and many other emotions. The free expression of the emotion of disgust is considered socially unacceptable in many countries.

Sociologist Randall Collins has stated that emotional energy is the main motivating force in social life, for love and hatred, investing, working or consuming, rendering cult or waging war. Emotional energy ranges from the highest heights of enthusiasm, self-confidence and initiative to the deepest depths of apathy, depression and retreat. Emotional energy comes from variously successful or failed chains of interaction rituals, that is, patterned social encounters –from conversation or sexual flirtation through Christmas family dinners or office work to mass demonstrations, organizations or revolutions. In the latter, the coupling of participants' behavior synchronizes their nervous systems to the point of generating a collective effervescence, one observable in their mutual focus and emotional entraining (incorrect use of word, "entraining"), as well as in their loading of emotional and symbolic meaning to entities which subsequently become emblems of the ritual and of the membership group endorsing, preserving, promoting and  defending them. Thus social life would be most importantly for generating and distributing emotional energy.

Affect Control Theory, originated by David R. Heise, proposes that social actions are designed by their agents to create impressions that befit sentiments reigning in a situation. Emotions are transient physical and subjective states depending on the current impression of the emoting person, and on the comparison of that impression with the sentiment attached to the person's identity. As such, emotions are visceral signals to self and observable signals to others about the individual's identity in the situation, and about the individual's understanding of events in the situation. Heise developed a simulation program for analyzing affect-control processes in social interaction, and for predicting moment-to-moment emotions of interactants. The program specifies emotions in terms of numerical profiles, emotion words, and cartoon-like drawings of interactants' facial expressions. A complete review of affect control theory is provided in Heise's 2007 book, Expressive Order.

Empirical applications

Workplaces  

Following Hochschild's lead, the sociology of emotions has been applied extensively to a variety of workplace interactions. Jennifer Pierce, a student of Hochschild's, has examined law firms, for instance, and Robin Leidner the emotion work in fast food outlets.

Social Movements 

Inspired by James M. Jasper's cultural work in the late 1990s, especially The Art of Moral Protest, a number of scholars of protest and social movements have begun to examine the emotions involved. They include Erika Summers Effler, a student of Randall Collins who examines how emotions inform a sense of time in Laughing Saints and Righteous Heroes; Lynn Owens, who documents the emotions of a declining social movement, Amsterdam's squatters, in Cracking under Pressure; and Verta Taylor, whose book, Rock-a-Bye Baby documents struggles over the feelings new mothers are supposed to feel. Deborah Gould traces a number of emotional processes throughout the rise and fall of ACT UP in a series of articles and a book, Moving Politics. A 1999 conference, organized by James M. Jasper, Jeff Goodwin, and Francesca Polletta, helped spur this new development in social movement theory and research. Scholars worldwide have taken up the challenge to study the emotions of social movements, including a cluster of French researchers such as Olivier Fillieule, Isabelle Sommier, and Christophe Traini.

As a measure of religiosity
According to the sociologist Mervin Verbit, emotion may be understood as one of the key components of religiosity. Furthermore, religious emotion may be broken down into four dimensions:

 Content
 Frequency
 Intensity
 Centrality

The content of one's religious emotions may vary from situation to situation, as will the degree to which it may occupy the person (frequency), the intensity of the emotion, and the centrality of the emotional feeling (in that religious tradition, or person's life).

In this sense, emotion is somewhat similar to Charles Glock's "experience" dimension of religiosity (Glock, 1972: 39).

References

External links 
Emotional Culture and Identity (CEMID)